Prosit is an unincorporated community in Alborn Township, Saint Louis County, Minnesota, United States.

The community is located nine miles southeast of Meadowlands at the junction of Saint Louis County Highway 47 and West Shipley Road.  Prosit is also located nine miles west of Independence.  The community of Alborn is nearby.

Aerie Lake, Crooked Lake, Eier Lake, Maple Leaf Lake, and Round Lake are all in the vicinity.

References

 Official State of Minnesota Highway Map – 2011/2012 edition

Unincorporated communities in Minnesota
Unincorporated communities in St. Louis County, Minnesota